KBAK may refer to:

 KBAK-TV, a television station (channel 29 analog/33 digital) licensed to Bakersfield, California, United States
 the ICAO code for Columbus Municipal Airport (Indiana)